Sir William Wray, 1st Baronet, of Glentworth, Lincolnshire (c. 1555 – 13 August 1617) was an English Member of Parliament.

He represented the constituency of Grimsby from 1584 to 1585, Lincolnshire in 1601 and Grimsby again from 1604 to November 1611. He was appointed High Sheriff of Lincolnshire in 1594 and was created a baronet on 25 November 1611.

Wray was a patron of religion. The Estate of the Church, with the Discourse of Times (1602), translated and expanded by Simon Patrick from Jean de Hainault was dedicated to him. John Smyth regarded Wray as the major supporter of "godly" religion in the county.

Monuments to Wray and his second wife, Frances (died 1647), and to Susanna Drury, sister of Frances, exist at St Peter's church Ashby cum Fenby.

Family
He was the son of Christopher Wray, by his wife Anne, daughter of Nicholas Girlington of Normanby, Yorkshire. He married, first, in 1580, Lucy, eldest daughter of Edward Montagu of Boughton and Elizabeth Harington, and grandson of the judge Sir Edward Montagu. They had eight sons and a daughter:
Sir John Wray, 2nd Baronet
Nathaniel Wray (May 1591 – July 1591) (d.s.p.)
Philip Wray (born June 1596) (d.s.p.)
Benjamin Wray (d.s.p.)
Charles Wray (d.s.p.)
Christopher Wray (d.s.p.)
Nathaniel Wray (died December 1640, s.p.)
Edward Wray (died 20 March 1658), a Groom of the Bedchamber, married Elizabeth Norris, who left an only daughter, Bridget, who became 4th Baroness Norreys in right of her mother.
Elizabeth Wray (died April 1638), married Sir Francis Foljambe, 1st Baronet on 21 October 1614 and had issue

Sir William married secondly, about 1600, Frances Drury, widow of Sir Nicholas Clifford of Bobbing, Kent, and daughter of Sir William Drury of Hawsted, Suffolk, and Elizabeth Stafford, by whom he was father of:
Sir Christopher Wray (1601–1646) of Ashby and Barlings.
George Wray (October 1603 – 1606)
Charles Wray (born March or April 1605), killed fighting in Spain.
Frances Wray (born October 1610), married on 25 March 1623 Sir Anthony Irby of Boston, Lincs., and had issue.

References

Attribution

1550s births
1617 deaths
Members of the Parliament of England for Great Grimsby
Baronets in the Baronetage of England
High Sheriffs of Lincolnshire
English MPs 1584–1585
English MPs 1601
English MPs 1604–1611